Alexanda Amon Kotey (born 13 December 1983), known as Jihadi George, is a former British citizen who in 2021 in a U.S. Federal Court pleaded guilty to "hostage-taking resulting in death and providing material support to the Islamic State group from 2012 through 2015".

Previously, he had been captured by the Syrian Democratic Forces while he was reportedly fleeing from the collapse of the Islamic State of Iraq and the Levant (ISIL), a terrorist group known for its activities primarily in war-torn Iraq and Syria. He has been designated a terrorist by the United States and identified in the media as one of the four "Jihadi Beatles" who took part in ISIL atrocities in the Syrian Civil War. Kotey has denied being a member of the "Beatles" but has admitted to joining the ISIL terrorist group and going to Syria.

Early life
Born in Britain to a Ghanaian father and Greek Cypriot mother, Kotey spent his youth in Shepherd's Bush. The Daily Telegraph reported that he was a supporter of Queens Park Rangers F.C. and dreamed of joining the team when he grew up. Syrian Democratic Forces holding him in detention say Kotey worked as a drug dealer in London prior to his radicalisation. He is believed to have converted to Islam in his early twenties and left his two young children behind in Britain.

Time in ISIL
In 2014 and 2015, ISIL held dozens of European and North American captives, and the brutal conditions of their detention were widely reported. Four English-speaking ISIL fighters played a central role in the brutality.  Their identities were initially either not known, or security officials did not make their identities known to the public, so the press dubbed the four as the Jihadi Beatles, with the most well-known being known as Jihadi John.  Later Kotey was reported to have been one of the other three Beatles.

On 10 January 2017, the United States Department of State formally designated Kotey as a terrorist under the authority of Executive Order 13224. This designation prohibited American citizens, financial institutions, and other American corporations, from having any financial dealings with him.

The US claims that Kotey was involved in beheadings and known for administering "exceptionally cruel torture methods", including "electronic shocks". He was accused of acting as an ISIL recruiter and being responsible for inducing several other British extremists to join ISIL. Kotey has denied being a member of "the Beatles", but admitted to having joined the ISIL terrorist group.

ISIL-controlled areas of Syria and Iraq underwent a steady erosion in 2015, 2016 and 2017, with their remaining enclaves collapsing in late 2017 and early 2018. On 24 January 2018, Kotey and El Shafee Elsheikh, a friend from London who was also reported to have been one of the Jihadi Beatles, were captured in Syria while attempting to flee to Turkey.

Prosecution
The Independent reported that the United Kingdom government was considering agreeing that Kotey and Elsheikh could be transferred to the Guantanamo detention camps. Detention in Guantanamo might mean indefinite detention without charge; if transferred to US custody for a civilian trial and convicted, they would likely be detained at the Supermax prison near Florence, Colorado.Another option under consideration is trial at the International Court in The Hague. Tobias Ellwood of the UK Ministry of Defence had argued that transfer to Guantanamo was inappropriate.

In March 2018, Kotey and El Shafee Elsheikh complained that their British citizenship had "illegally" been withdrawn (judges have previously found the UK in breach of international law when stripping citizenship from terror suspects who are not dual nationals), leaving them stateless and at risk of "rendition and torture". UK security minister Ben Wallace confirmed in July 2018 that both men had been stripped of their UK citizenship.

While the UK will not normally extradite suspects if they might be subject to the death penalty, in July 2018 it was reported that British Home Secretary Sajid Javid had written to the US attorney general about the case, saying "I am of the view that there are strong reasons for not requiring a death penalty assurance in this specific case, so no such assurances will be sought." Javid said that the decision was for this specific case, not a change to the government's support of the global abolition of the death penalty. The BBC security correspondent said that the UK was opposed to the controversial military prison in Guantanamo Bay: if the two were sent there, the UK would not share intelligence for the trial; but if they were to go to a criminal trial in the US, then the UK would.

On 9 October 2019, Charlie Savage, of The New York Times, reported that Kotey and El Shafee Elsheikh were in the process of being transferred from Kurdish territories to custody of the US. On 7 October 2020, Kotey and El Shafee Elsheikh were brought to the United States to face charges of beheading western hostages.

In September 2021, it was announced that, as per a plea agreement, Kotey would plead guilty to all of the charges against him and would spend the rest of his life in prison, initially in the US and, after  15 years, in the United Kingdom. On 2 September 2021, The New York Times reported that Kotey had pleaded guilty to 'multiple charges, including conspiracy to commit hostage taking resulting in death and conspiracy to murder U.S. citizens outside the United States'.

On 29 April 2022, Kotey was sentenced to life in prison at the federal courthouse in Alexandria, Virginia for the beheading and torturing of four American hostages in Syria.

On 31 August 2022, Kotey was transferred to the custody of the Federal Bureau of Prisons and moved to United States Penitentiary, Canaan.

References

1983 births
Living people
Converts to Islam
English Islamists
English people of Ghanaian descent
English people of Greek Cypriot descent
Islamic State of Iraq and the Levant members
Islamic State of Iraq and the Levant and the United Kingdom
People extradited from Iraq
People extradited to the United States